The Beachcomber is a 1915 American drama silent film directed by Phil Rosen and written by Hobart Bosworth. The film stars Hobart Bosworth, Helen Wolcott, Mr. Rahawanaku, Cora Drew, John Weiss and W.F. Harrison. The film was released in 1915, by Paramount Pictures.

Plot

Cast 
Hobart Bosworth as The Sailor
Helen Wolcott as Taleaa
Mr. Rahawanaku as Kane Pili
Cora Drew as Mother
John Weiss as Maukaa
W.F. Harrison as Nalu
J. Harvey as Ka'alehai
Dan Waid as Waonokiki
Rhea Haines as Palikii
Marshall Stedman as Mate of the Edith / Missionary

References

External links 
 

1915 films
1910s English-language films
1915 drama films
Paramount Pictures films
American black-and-white films
Films directed by Phil Rosen
1910s American films